is a 2011 Japanese anime film and television series about the Yamazaki family, who live in Tokyo during Shōwa 39 (1964), the same year Tokyo hosts the 1964 Summer Olympics. The film, directed by Masahiro Murakami, was released in Japan on January 29, 2011. The series had its broadcast run between April and July 2011.

Plot

Characters

Episode list

References

External links 
 
 

2011 anime films
Anime series
Works set in factories